The 1968 Oklahoma State Cowboys football team represented Oklahoma State University–Stillwater in the Big Eight Conference during the 1968 NCAA University Division football season. In their sixth and final season under head coach Phil Cutchin, the Cowboys compiled a 3–7 record (2–5 against conference opponents), tied for sixth place in the conference, and were outscored by opponents by a combined total of 288 to 161.

On offense, the 1968 team averaged 16.1 points scored, 136.3 rushing yards, and 172.8 passing yards per game.  On defense, the team allowed an average of 28.8 points scored, 256.0 rushing yards, and 162.5 passing yards per game. The team's statistical leaders included Duane Porter with 307 rushing yards, Ronnie Johnson with 1,438 passing yards, Terry Brown with 688 receiving yards, and Wayne Hallmark with 18 points scored.

Offensive lineman Jon Kolb was selected by the Associated Press, United Press International, and Central Press Association as a first-team All-American. Kolb and middle guard John Little were selected as first-team All-Big Eight Conference players.

The team played its home games at Lewis Field in Stillwater, Oklahoma.

Schedule

After the season

The 1969 NFL/AFL Draft was held on January 28–29, 1969. The following Cowboys were selected.

References

Oklahoma State
Oklahoma State Cowboys football seasons
Oklahoma State Cowboys football